NFL Sunday Ticket is an out-of-market sports package that broadcasts National Football League (NFL) regular season games unavailable on local affiliates.  It carries all regional Sunday afternoon games produced by Fox and CBS. The ideal customer of this package is presumed (based on advertisements) to be a fan of a team who is unable to see their team on local television because they do not reside in one of that team's markets, or sports bars who want to increase business by attracting fans of out of market teams. From 1994 to 2023, the package was distributed in the United States exclusively by DirecTV (which also offered it on the Internet, on certain tablets and smartphones, and JetBlue flights). The package is also currently offered in Canada on streaming service DAZN, in Mexico and Central America  on SKY México, in South America and the Caribbean on Vrio, and several cable providers in The Bahamas and Bermuda.

Beginning with the 2023 NFL season, for residential customers in the United States, NFL Sunday Ticket will move exclusively to YouTube TV, as well as to YouTube's recently-launched Primetime Channels service as a standalone subscription option. DirecTV remains in talks to retain the rights to offer the package to bars, restaurants, and other commercial venues.

United States
Satellite TV provider DirecTV has exclusive rights to the NFL Sunday Ticket package in the United States until it expires at the end of the 2022 NFL season. Although other satellite and cable providers supposedly are allowed to bid on the rights to carry NFL Sunday Ticket if they agree to carry the NFL Network, DirecTV decided to extend their current contract beyond 2014 by paying the NFL $1.5 billion per year for the next eight years. Reaching the deal was also a condition of AT&T's 2015 acquisition of DirecTV. As of the 2015 season, the service is now available through an online-only subscription exclusively for those who are unable to use DirecTV services.

DirecTV offers a free preview of NFL Sunday Ticket for the first week of the season.

In 2023, the streaming television service YouTube TV will begin offering NFL Sunday Ticket upon the start of the 2023 NFL season.

NFL Sunday Ticket viewers do not count towards local Nielsen ratings. Thus, offering NFL Sunday Ticket on cable cost CBS and Fox affiliates millions of dollars in lost revenue from local commercial breaks (as opposed to national ads sold by the networks). In turn, affiliates help subsidize the networks' programming costs. Therefore, CBS and Fox have rules in their broadcasting contracts that mandate that NFL Sunday Ticket subscribers must be charged at a premium price.

Blackouts

Games scheduled to air on the local Fox and CBS affiliates within a viewer's designated media market (determined by the ZIP Code of the viewer's address) are blacked out on the NFL Sunday Ticket feed sent to their receiver. Viewers must watch these games on their local broadcast stations instead. (This applies to live streaming of said games as well.)

Until the end of the 2014 season, if a game the viewer wished to watch was blacked out in their home market because it was not sold out, the game remained blacked out on NFL Sunday Ticket. Games joined or switched away from in progress usually had their blackout status altered immediately. The NFL suspended the local blackout policy for the 2015 NFL regular season, and has since done so indefinitely.

Extra features
DirecTV offers the following extra features. From 2005–09 these features were part of an add-on package called Superfan and cost $100 extra. As of 2012, some of them are part of the NFL Sunday Ticket Max package which costs an extra $100.

From 2009 to 2019, all games were in high definition. The HD games were formerly part of the Superfan package.

Game Mix
This channel shows eight games at once, along with the game's score, time left in the game, and the quarter that the game is in under the game's feed. Starting in 2008, it added a high-definition feed, and in 2011, it added larger cells when four or fewer games are being played.

Red Zone Channel
Hosted by Andrew Siciliano and launched in 2005, the Red Zone Channel offered commercial-free "whiparound" coverage of all games in progress on Sunday afternoons, highlighting key plays (scoring plays, key turnovers, etc.). While nearly identical in format, the DirecTV Red Zone Channel was separate from the NFL RedZone service hosted by Scott Hanson that launched four years later in 2009, which is produced by NFL Network and distributed to other television providers and platforms. The two services co-existed until the 2022 announcement that Sunday Ticket would move exclusively to YouTube TV; there will not be a version of the service specific to Sunday Ticket, and YouTube TV will distribute only NFL RedZone.

Fantasy Zone Channel
Originally hosted by Kay Adams, and later by Dan Hellie, the Fantasy Zone Channel offered valuable insights, last-minute roster tips, live updates, top-scoring players on the day, and advice to fantasy players before and after kickoff.

Short Cuts
This two-channel duo recaps every NFL game in 30 minutes or less, including games not available on NFL Sunday Ticket because they were televised locally or blacked out. One channel shows AFC games while the other shows NFC games. These highlights are made available on Sunday nights and are shown continuously until Tuesday morning. As of 2012, it is only available on the NFL Sunday Ticket Max package.

Highlights on Demand
DirecTV subscribers with interactive DVRs receive a three- to four-minute recap of every NFL Sunday Ticket game on demand with this feature, via channel 1005. As of 2012, it is only available on the new NFL Sunday Ticket Max package.

NFL.com Fantasy Football TV app
Starting in 2011, the NFL.com Fantasy Football TV app allows NFL.com fantasy players with Internet-connected set-top boxes to view their NFL.com Fantasy Football teams and scores directly on their TV screen.

Computers, tablets and smartphones
NFL Sunday Ticket Max subscribers were able to stream games on the Internet and their smartphones and tablets. Starting in 2009, NFL Sunday Ticket To Go became available to non-DirecTV subscribers who were unable to receive satellite television in their homes or apartments due to line of sight issues, costing $50 more than those with DirecTV service. DirecTV offered NFL Sunday Ticket To Go on Motorola Xoom and Samsung Galaxy tablets; Motorola Android phones; the iPad, iPhone, iPod Touch, BlackBerry OS devices with 3G or wifi, Palm Pre/Pixi, and other Droid-branded phones.

Gaming consoles
For those who did have DirecTV, the NFL also offered the Sunday Ticket package for the PlayStation 3, PlayStation 4, Xbox 360 and Xbox One video game consoles.

JetBlue
Between September 26, 2010 and December 29, 2019, DirecTV offered the full slate of NFL Sunday Ticket games on JetBlue flights to 50 destinations across the United States.

History
The concept of NFL Sunday Ticket was largely invented by Jon Taffer during his three-year term on the board of NFL Enterprises, along with NFL Chief of Marketing Michael Miller. NFL Sunday Ticket was launched in 1994 and was initially available on C band and  satellites, for which the receiving dishes are larger in size. DirecTV would become involved later in the 1994 season, airing the NFL Sunday Ticket package in the last 5 weeks of the regular season, before beginning to air the package in full the following year. In 1998, the service became available to cable systems in Canada, with the first systems to offer the service being Rogers Cable in Ontario. The exclusivity of Sunday Ticket to cable providers resulted in a complaint from ExpressVu (now Bell Satellite TV) to the CRTC, seeking to force the NFL to open the service to Canadian satellite providers; the CRTC dismissed the complaint.

DirecTV is under contract to carry NFL Sunday Ticket until the end of the 2022 season. The service and its majority owner, AT&T, are on the record as questioning the value of the package with less than half of the subscribers DirecTV would need to break even using Sunday Ticket plus the league adding more games outside the traditional Sunday afternoon windows. On opening weekend of the 2021 season, CNBC reported that the league was interested in partnering with a streaming service for future rights, along with a stake in NFL Network. This would end DirecTV's relationship with the NFL after nearly three decades. In July 2022, NFL commissioner Roger Goodell told CNBC that the league would select a streaming service to host Sunday Ticket, with the winning service being announced that fall. Leading streaming providers Amazon, Apple Inc., and ESPN are all candidates to win the contract. That month, the New York Times reported that YouTube had also submitted a bid for Sunday Ticket. In October, CNBC reported that Apple wanted flexible and unrestricted global streaming rights, something that the NFL cannot offer due its existing deals with CBS and Fox that guarantee exclusivity of local games. 

On December 22, 2022, the league announced that NFL Sunday Ticket would move exclusively to YouTube TV and YouTube's recently launched Primetime Channels service for residential customers. DirecTV remains among the bidders to retain the commercial rights to the package, allowing bars, restaurants, casinos, and other commercial venues to continue showing games without reconfiguring their systems to accommodate a streaming-only platform.

International distribution
NFL Sunday Ticket has also been available in Mexico, Latin America, Bermuda, The Bahamas and Canada. In most cases, alternate services like NFL Game Pass International have since replaced NFL Sunday Ticket in international countries and territories, though the service remains available internationally in limited circumstances as discussed below.

Canada
NFL Sunday Ticket was previously available in Canada through most major pay television providers, often in a bundle with other sports packages. In July 2017, it was announced that the streaming service DAZN had acquired the rights to the NFL's out-of-market package beginning in the 2017 NFL season. The games previously available through this service, as well as NFL Game Pass, are bundled with the provider's service in Canada.

However, after DAZN's Canadian launch was met with frequent technical problems and user criticism, DAZN announced that it had begun to offer NFL Sunday Ticket to television providers as an alternative to its over-the-top product.

México and Central America
SKY México

South America and Caribbean
Vrio

Brazil
Vivo TV

Bahamas
Cable Bahamas

See also
 NBA League Pass
 MLS Direct Kick
 MLB Extra Innings
 NHL Center Ice (U.S.)/NHL Centre Ice (Canada)
 NASCAR Hot Pass

References

External links 
 NFL Sunday Ticket

Sunday Ticket
Satellite television
Television channels and stations established in 1994
Out-of-market sports packages